Roger Prideaux (by 1524 – 8 January 1582), of Soldon, Holsworthy, Devon and London, was an English politician.

He was a Member (MP) of the Parliament of England for Totnes in 1545 and 1547.

References

1582 deaths
People from Torridge District
Year of birth uncertain
English MPs 1545–1547
English MPs 1547–1552
Members of the Parliament of England (pre-1707) for Totnes